The Florida Wildlife Corridor is a statewide network of nearly 18 million acres of connected lands and waters supporting wildlife and people. The connection between greenspace is important because many species need large ranges to hunt, breed, and maintain genetic diversity. Habitat loss and fragmentation are primary drivers of plant and animal population declines. The Florida Wildlife Corridor provides essential habitat and connectivity for many of Florida’s imperiled plants and animals.

The Florida Wildlife Corridor helps protect the habitats of Florida’s threatened and endangered species. This includes iconic wildlife such as Crested Caracara, Snail Kite, Florida Grasshopper Sparrow, Florida Scrub-Jay, Red-Cockaded Woodpecker, Whooping Crane, Wood Stork, Florida Panther, West Indian Manatee, Gulf Sturgeon, Okaloosa Darter, Sand Skink, and Eastern Indigo Snake. Of the 17.7 million acres the Florida Wildlife Corridor encompasses, 7 million acres are composed of working lands – ranchlands and timberlands. Many of these working lands are still unprotected yet are a vital component to conservation in Florida.

The Florida Wildlife Corridor boundary has been simplified for online use on iNaturalist. If you are interested in performing an analysis with the Corridor boundary, please visit http://conservation.dcp.ufl.edu/fegnproject/ or contact Dr. Tom Hoctor at the UF Center for Landscape Conservation Planning for the current, official Corridor boundary.

About the Florida Wildlife Corridor Foundation 
The Florida Wildlife Corridor Foundation’s mission is to champion a collaborative campaign to permanently connect, protect and restore the Florida Wildlife Corridor. The Foundation exists to ignite the Corridor vision. They align efforts to lead conservation of the Corridor’s highest priorities and accelerate connectivity by providing tools and resources that elevate other organizations working to protect these landscapes. Through expeditions, art, film, and storytelling, the organization has gained statewide support that led to the unanimous passing of the Florida Wildlife Corridor Act in 2021.    

In April 2022 the Corridor Foundation began hosting an annual summit to convene hundreds of conservationists, thought leaders, business and real estate experts, policy makers, state agency leaders, and elected officials for discussions, collaboration, and problem-solving all geared toward conserving the Florida Wildlife Corridor. 

The Foundation’s CEO is Mallory Lykes Dimmitt and is governed by a board of directors composed of conservationists, entrepreneurs and private sector community leaders.

Economic Benefits of the Corridor 
The Florida Wildlife Corridor Foundation engaged McKinsey & Company to provide analytics to assess the economic impact of the Corridor and the mechanisms by which the opportunity areas could be effectively and efficiently conserved. The research found that the Florida Wildlife Corridor not only provides inherent scientific, recreational, and cultural value, but also supports significant economic activities and national security missions within the state.  

Specifically:  

 The Corridor is home to 60 species at risk of extinction, such as the Florida panther and grasshopper sparrow.  
 The Corridor supports at least 114,000 jobs and provides $30 billion in annual value in sectors such as recreation, tourism, and agriculture including ranching and forestry. Between 2022–2030, this number is estimated to total about $298 billion (Conservative figures, not all Corridor benefits quantified).  
 With three major U.S. Department of Defense commands and several vital military bases located in or near the Corridor, these open spaces are vital to national security.

Florida Wildlife Corridor Ideation 

The Florida Wildlife Corridor was conceptualized by Tom Hoctor, Director of the Center for Landscape and Conservation Planning at the University of Florida and Carlton Ward Jr, Conservation Photographer and founder of the Legacy Institute for Nature & Culture (LINC). Their vision and collaboration were inspired by the bear research of David Maehr and the commitment of his students, Wade Ulrey and Joe Guthrie, to continue his legacy.

The project was inspired partly by Lawton Chiles, a former U.S. lawmaker from Florida who promoted his 1970 Senate bid by hiking 1,003 miles from Pensacola to Key West. The Florida Wildlife Corridor Expeditions borrow his method, not his political motivation as they address the fragmentation of natural landscapes and watersheds in Florida.

Goals for Protecting and Restoring the Corridor 
The Florida Wildlife Corridor project is a collaborative vision to connect remaining natural lands, waters, working farms and ranches from the Everglades to Georgia, protecting a functional ecological corridor for the health of people, wildlife and watersheds. Despite extensive fragmentation of the landscape in recent decades, a statewide network of connected natural areas is still possible. By informing Floridians about the Corridor, the Foundation hopes to increase awareness of the concerning issue and ultimately accomplish the following goals:

Protect and restore habitat and migration corridors essential for the survival of Florida's diverse wildlife, including wide-ranging panthers, black bears and other native species.
 Continue to safeguard the major waterways and safeguard Florida’s water supply.
 Sustain the food production, economies and cultural legacies of working ranches and farms within the corridor.
 Bolster local economies through increased opportunities such as hunting, fishing, birdwatching and other forms of eco-tourism.
 Give wildlife and plants room to adapt to a changing climate and sea level rise.
 Raise awareness about connectivity between natural and rural landscapes.
 Identify and promote the relationships between the coastal wetlands and the dunes that protect us, the working farms and ranches that feed us, the forests that clean our air, and the combined habitat these lands provide for Florida's diverse wildlife, including manatees and sea turtles.

Expeditions and Documentary Films 
Expeditions through the Florida Wildlife Corridor, and subsequent films, began in 2012 to share the Corridor concept and vision and to highlight chokepoints along the Corridor that are in danger of severing the Corridor forever. 

Treks and Films: 

2012: Everglades to Okefenokee  

2015: The Forgotten Coast  

2018: The Last Green Thread 

2019: The Wild Divide  

2021: Home Waters

Corridor Landmarks 

Landmarks to explore (among many others):

 The Suwannee River 
 Chassahowitzka National Wildlife Refuge
 Withlacoochee State Forest 
 Goethe State Forest
 St. Marks National Wildlife Refuge 
 Steinhatchee Conservation Area 
 Apalachicola National Forest 
 The Apalachicola River Basin
 The Northwest Florida Greenway
 Nokuse Plantation 
 The Choctawhatchee River Water Management Area

References

External links 
 Website
 Facebook
 Twitter
 YouTube

Environment of Florida